University High School (UHS) is an American public college preparatory high school located in the Tolleson Union High School District in Arizona. The UHS mission statement is "harnessing the power of dreams". The school mascot is a lighthouse, and the colors that represent it are green and gold.

History
University High School opened in 2006. It was founded by Dr. Dean and three co-founders. It is a shared campus with Tolleson Union High School, established in 1927. It is currently ranked #6 in Arizona according to US News in 2016, and is ranked #36 in America according to US News.

Curriculum 
All of the students at University High School take AP classes every year. The schedule of classes are all AP/advanced except for electives, which can be taken with Tolleson, or West-Mec. Advisory days are every Tuesday.

Admission
Students that wish to attend can apply during 8th grade, after 9th/10th grade, or (special cases ONLY) 11th grade.

References 
 US News 2015

External links 
 http://university.tuhsd.org/

Public high schools in Arizona
Schools in Maricopa County, Arizona